RAF Southam is a former Royal Air Force relief landing ground (RLG) located  east of Southam, Warwickshire, England and  south east of Royal Leamington Spa, Warwickshire, England.

The airfield opened in 1940 and was mainly used by 9 Elementary Flying Training School training pilots. The airfield closed 18 December 1944.

Based units
No. 9 Elementary Flying Training School (9 EFTS) using Tiger Moths. The School was mainly based at RAF Ansty but Southam was used as a satellite station and operated from 3 September 1939 until 31 March 1944.

No. 18 (Pilots) Advanced Flying Unit RAF (18(P)AFU) flew Airspeed Oxfords and Boulton Paul Defiants mostly from RAF Church Lawford but also from other sites including RAF Hockley Heath and Southam. The unit operated from 27 October 1942 until 29 May 1945.

Accidents and incidents

Current use
There is now a housing estate on the site of the airfield, known as Flying Fields.

References

External links
 Wartime Memories Project

Airports in England
Royal Air Force stations in Warwickshire
Royal Air Force stations of World War II in the United Kingdom
RAF